A shrug is a gesture performed by raising both shoulders, and is a representation of an individual either being indifferent about something or not knowing an answer to a question. The shoulder-raising action may be accompanied by rotating the palms upwards, pulling closed lips downwards, raising the eyebrows or tilting the head to one side. A shrug is an emblem, meaning that it integrates the vocabulary of only certain cultures and may be used in place of words. In many countries, such as the United States, Sweden and Morocco, a shrug represents hesitation or lack of knowledge; however, in other countries, such as Japan and China, shrugging is uncommon and is not used to show hesitation. People from the Philippines, Iran and Iraq may interpret a shrug as a somewhat impolite sign of confidence.

Emoji
The shrug emoticon, made from Unicode characters, is also typed as ¯\_(ツ)_/¯, where "ツ" is the character tsu from Japanese katakana.

See also
Indifference (emotion)
Meh

References

Gestures
Human communication